Nader Ahmadi (born September 12, 1986)  is an Iranian footballer, who played for Paykan of the Iran's Premier Football League.

Professional
Ahmadi joined Foolad in 2007 after spending the previous season at Pas Tehran F.C.

Club Career Statistics
Last Update  3 September 2010 

 Assist Goals

References

Living people
1986 births
Association football midfielders
Iranian footballers
Pas players
Foolad FC players
Persian Gulf Pro League players
Azadegan League players